A media prank is a type of media event, perpetrated by staged speeches, activities, or press releases, designed to trick legitimate journalists into publishing erroneous or misleading articles.  The term may also refer to such stories if planted by fake journalists, as well as the false story thereby published.  A media prank is a form of culture jamming generally done as performance art or a practical joke for purposes of a humorous critique of mass media.

Notable instances
In May 1927, Jean-Paul Sartre, who was known as one of the fiercest pranksters at the École Normale Superieure organized with his comrades Nizan, Larroutis, Baillou and Herland, a media prank following Charles Lindbergh's successful New York-Paris flight. Sartre & Co. called newspapers telling them that Lindbergh would be awarded an honorary degree by the École. Many newspapers including Le Petit Parisien announced the event on May 25 and thousands showed up, unaware that they were witnessing a stunt with a look-alike. A scandal followed resulting in the resignation of the École director Gustave Lanson.

One well-known 1967 prank, orchestrated by Abbie Hoffman and Allen Ginsberg and chronicled in Norman Mailer's Armies of the Night, involved a mock gathering protesting the Vietnam War (that many media took as a serious but misguided effort) intended to levitate the Pentagon.

Joey Skaggs is one of the most prolific creators of media pranks in the United States, often using actors to stage outlandish public events that are then covered by news media as real stories.  Among his many pranks, he convinced United Press International to report that cockroach hormones had been identified as a cure for arthritis, and tricked WABC-TV in New York city to create a news segment (which was nominated for an Emmy Award despite being untrue) about a supposed "cathouse for dogs".

The band Negativland is (according to Time Magazine) "better known for media pranks than records".  The band, as an excuse for cancelling an upcoming tour, issued a press release claiming that a teenager who had committed a multiple ax murder did so after arguing with his parents over the meaning of its song, "Christianity Is Stupid".  The story was picked up and reprinted as true by mass media, and the band wrote later songs about having perpetrated the hoax.  In 2003 the band issued a series of press releases accusing Seattle, Washington, radio station KJR-FM of playing 1980s music despite claiming it only played "the best of the 60s and 70s" then, after the radio station changed its format, issued more press releases announcing that it had all been a prank.

Beginning in 1999 with the fake campaign-oriented website gwbush.com, the Yes Men have impersonated famous celebrities, politicians, and business officials at appearances, interviews, websites, and other media to make political points.

In December 2009, an Argentina news station fell victim to a media prank. Acting on a Facebook link, an investigative reporter believed that the latest trend in underage drinking was tied to a new cocktail mix called Grog XD. Unbeknown to the reporter, the 
recipe was from the video game The Secret of Monkey Island.

Voltswagen joke 

In March 2021, several major media outlets reported that Volkswagen was rebranding itself as "Voltswagen" to focus on the development of electric vehicles. Despite the company's release of an official statement declaring the name change was an early April Fools' joke, CNN, NBC News, and The Washington Post fell for the gag.

Ligma-Johnson hoax 

On October 28, 2022, a pair of amateur improvisational actors pranked multiple major media outlets with a spontaneous and intentionally transparent hoax that was revealed the same day. As reporters congregated outside Twitter headquarters on the day Elon Musk took control of the company, the instigator, playing the fictional role of Rahul Ligma, "thought it would be really funny" if he and a friend "walked out with a [cardboard] box and they fell for it." After interviewing the two pranksters, neither of whom had ever worked for Twitter, journalists at CNBC, Bloomberg, ABC News, and other networks reported that mass layoffs were underway. On October 31, 2022, CNBC's Deidre Bosa apologized and told The Daily Beast, "They got me" and "I didn't do enough to confirm who they were".

The India Times called the hoax "perfectly-timed" and "one of the greatest pranks on the internet". Blake Shuster wrote in USA Today that the journalists involved were "duped by real life trolls" and "all it would’ve taken was 30 seconds to stop and actually do their jobs to avoid the whole news-cycle". One of the actors explained that the stunt was spontaneous, and that "I was hoping at least one guy there would get it and they would turn off the cameras".

The following month, Musk called their October media stunt "one of the best trolls ever" and continued the joke by apologizing for "firing these geniuses", facetiously saying it was "truly one of [my] biggest mistakes" and offered them their jobs back. The Hindi news channel Aaj Tak reported the comic duo's fictional rehiring as an actual news story,  as did the Voice of Indonesia, and The Hill.

Critique
Although media pranks may serve as legitimate criticism of the press, and artistic creations in their own right, they are often criticized not only for the disruption they cause but as simple publicity stunts that take advantage of the very failures of mass media that they ostensibly oppose.  Skaggs has criticized the Flash mob movement, as being frivolous and lacking the countercultural element of more serious protest art.

See also
Media circus
List of April Fool's Day jokes
Culture jamming
Situationist prank

References

External links
artoftheprank.com - website devoted, among other things, to covering media pranks

Political art
Culture jamming techniques
Publicity stunts
Lists of practical jokes